Kevin Kruger (born May 1, 1983) is a former American professional basketball player, currently the head coach at UNLV.

Playing career
The son of basketball coach Lon Kruger, he attended Arizona State University, but after playing 3 years and graduating because he was redshirted his freshman year, he transferred to UNLV to play for his dad. During his one year there he helped UNLV advance to the Sweet Sixteen, only to lose to Oregon.

After his collegiate career, Kruger was not drafted, later receiving an invite to the Orlando Magic's training camp. Before the season began, he was cut and drafted by the Flash, the Utah Jazz's D-League team. He had a career high 35 points against the Reno Bighorns on March 1, 2009.

In the 2011-2012 season in the Ethias League, Kruger played for Okapi Aalstar. They won the Belgian Cup against the Antwerp Giants, 96-89 in overtime, a game during which Kevin scored 31 points.

Kruger initially attended Centennial High School in Champaign, Illinois, where he was a member of the basketball team. At the conclusion of his sophomore season, he moved to Marietta, GA. He then attended Walton High School in Marietta, Georgia.

Coaching career
Kruger began his coaching career at Northern Arizona as an assistant for two seasons before joining his father's staff at Oklahoma. In 2019, he returned to UNLV as an assistant coach under T. J. Otzelberger. When Otzelberger departed for the Iowa State head coaching position, Kruger was promoted to head coach of the Runnin' Rebels.

Head coaching record

College

References

External links
Wrapping up third season as a pro, Kevin Kruger still happy on the hardwood

1983 births
Living people
American expatriate basketball people in Belgium
American expatriate basketball people in Bulgaria
American expatriate basketball people in Germany
American expatriate basketball people in Italy
American expatriate basketball people in Mexico
American men's basketball players
Arizona State Sun Devils men's basketball players
BBC Aalstar players
Eisbären Bremerhaven players
Los Angeles D-Fenders players
Northern Arizona Lumberjacks men's basketball coaches
Nuova AMG Sebastiani Basket Rieti players
Oklahoma Sooners men's basketball coaches
PBC Academic players
Point guards
Soles de Mexicali players
UNLV Runnin' Rebels basketball coaches
UNLV Runnin' Rebels basketball players
Utah Flash players